The 2015 Meiji Yasuda J3 League (2015 明治安田生命J3リーグ) was the 19th season of the third tier in Japanese football, and the 2nd season of the professional J3 League.

Clubs

To participate, a club must have held an associate membership, or have submitted an application before 30 June 2014, and then passed an inspection to obtain a participation license issued by J.League Council. J.League has confirmed the following clubs participating in the 2015 J3 season:

Competition rules
The league is played in three rounds, each team playing a total of 36 matches. J.League U-22 Selection played all their matches on the road.

Each team must have at least 3 players holding professional contracts. Two foreign players are allowed per team, plus 1 more from the ASEAN partner country of J. League. The matchday roster will consist of 16 players, and up to 5 substitutes will be allowed in a game.

Promotion and relegation 
Rules for promotion to J2 are largely similar to those of Japan Football League in the recent seasons: to be promoted, a club must hold a J2 license and finish in top 2 of the league. The U-22 team is not eligible for promotion regardless of their final position. The champions will be promoted directly, in exchange with 22nd-placed J2 club, and the runners-up will participate in the playoffs with 21st J2 club. If either or both top 2 finishers are ineligible for promotion, the playoffs and/or direct exchange will not be held in accordance to the exact positions of promotion-eligible clubs.

No relegation to JFL is planned. Up to 2 clubs may be promoted if they are licensed by J. League for J3 participation and finish in top 4 of JFL.

Personnel and kits

Note: Flags indicate national team as has been defined under FIFA eligibility rules. Players may hold more than one non-FIFA nationality.

Managerial changes

Foreign players
Note:
A special team, composed of best J1 and J2 youngsters to prepare them for the 2016 Olympics

League table

Results

Rounds 1–13

Rounds 14–26

Rounds 27–39

Promotion/relegation playoffs
2015 J2/J3 Play-Offs (2015 J2・J3入れ替え戦)

Machida Zelvia was promoted to J2 League.Oita Trinita was relegated to J3 League.

Top scorers

Updated to games played on 23 November 2015Source: Meiji Yasuda J3 League Stats & Data - Ranking:Goals

Attendances

References

J3 League seasons
3